Machulince is a village and municipality in Zlaté Moravce District of the Nitra Region, in western-central Slovakia. Total municipality population was 1044 in 2000.

History
In historical records the village was first mentioned in 1275.

Geography
The municipality lies at an altitude of 230 metres and covers an area of 9.421 km².

References

External links
Official homepage

Villages and municipalities in Zlaté Moravce District